Cool-jams is an American apparel company. It is the largest wicking sleepwear company in the United States

History
Cool-jams was founded by Anita Mahaffey in 2007 as an online store selling bedding and pajamas. The privately held company both produces and retails its goods. Mahaffey serves as the company’s CEO, and the company was founded in San Diego.

Products
Products are designed to wick heat and moisture away from the body during rest and manage temperature regulation issues. Mahaffey developed the line after her own experiences with menopause. The quick drying, moisture wicking products have also been designed for individuals living in or traveling to hot climates. The company has customers in about 150 countries, and is the largest wicking sleepwear company in the United States. In 2013 Apparel Magazine named its products one of the most innovative of 2013. 20% of the company’s profits are donated to women and children focused charities.

References

External links
 

2007 establishments in California
Companies based in San Diego
Retail companies based in California
Clothing retailers of the United States